Goniolimon tataricum is a species of flowering plant in the genus Goniolimon, family Plumbaginaceae. It is called German statice, Tatarian sea-lavender, Tartarian statice or just statice. It is native to Albania, Algeria, Bulgaria, Greece, Kazakhstan, the North Caucasus, Romania, Southern Russia, Tunisia, Ukraine and the former Yugoslavia. It is planted in gardens as a border and ground cover, and also used in the cut flower industry.

Varieties
Two varieties are currently accepted:

Goniolimon tataricum var. platypterum (Klokov) Tzvelev
Goniolimon tataricum var. tauricum

References

Plumbaginaceae
Plants described in 1848
Taxa named by Carl Linnaeus
Taxa named by Pierre Edmond Boissier
Flora of Albania
Flora of Algeria
Flora of Bulgaria
Flora of Greece
Flora of Kazakhstan
Flora of the North Caucasus
Flora of Romania
Flora of Russia
Flora of Tunisia
Flora of Ukraine
Flora of Yugoslavia